Wall Brook Farm is a historic home and farm complex located near Luray, Page County, Virginia. The farmhouse was built about 1824, and is a two-story, six bay, Federal style brick dwelling with a gable roof.  It has a center-passage-plan and -story frame addition linked to a gambrel-roofed garage. The front facade features a full-facade one-story front porch. Located on the property are the contributing meathouse / wash house (c. 1890), wall and foot bridge, barn (1870s), dairy barn and milkhouse (c. 1950), shed (c. 1950), and the Brubaker Cemetery.

It was listed on the National Register of Historic Places in 2002.

References

Houses on the National Register of Historic Places in Virginia
Farms on the National Register of Historic Places in Virginia
Federal architecture in Virginia
Houses completed in 1824
Houses in Page County, Virginia
National Register of Historic Places in Page County, Virginia